Ronald McDonald House Charities Canada (RMHCC) is a non-profit organisation that provides temporary accommodation for families with seriously ill children who have to travel to access necessary medical care. RMHCC's 33 programs across Canada consist of 16 Ronald McDonald Houses, which provide families with a home near the hospital while their child is receiving treatment, and 17 Ronald McDonald Family Rooms, which provide families with a room within the hospital.

Locations

The RMHCC houses, rooms and care mobiles are located in:

 British Columbia: Vancouver, Surrey
 Alberta: Calgary, Edmonton, Medicine Hat, Red Deer
 Saskatchewan: Saskatoon, Prince Albert
 Manitoba: Winnipeg
 Ontario: Ottawa, Hamilton, London, Windsor, Toronto, Sudbury, Markham, Mississauga, Scarborough
 Quebec: Montreal, Quebec City
 Nova Scotia: Halifax, Moncton
 Newfoundland and Labrador: St-John's

Donations
Each Ronald McDonald House is independently operated by its own charitable organization, and is supported by individual and corporate donors. McDonald's restaurants in Canada hold an annual fundraising event called McHappy Day on which a portion of proceeds from all food and beverage items sold goes directly to RMHCC and other local children's charities. May 11, 2022 marked McDonald’s Canada’s 28th McHappy Day. The 2022 event raised more than $5.7 million to support families with sick children across Canada.

See also
Ronald McDonald House Charities
Ronald McDonald House New York

References

External links
 Official website

Charities based in Canada